Keeler, formerly known as Hawley, is a census-designated place (CDP) in Inyo County, California, United States. The population was 71 people at the 2020 census, up from 66 at the 2010 census.

History

When the 1872 Lone Pine earthquake rendered the pier in nearby Swansea inaccessible by uplifting the shoreline, a new pier was constructed to the south at a community named Hawley. In 1880 a new mill was constructed at Hawley by the Owens Lake Mining and Milling Company for processing silver ore from the Cerro Gordo Mines in the mountains to the east. A town was laid out by the company agent Julius M. Keeler, for whom the town of Hawley was later renamed.

The steamship Bessie Brady brought ore from Keeler across the lake to the town of Cartago.  There was a 300-foot wharf at Keeler, and the steamship route cut days off the time a freight wagon would have taken to circle the lake. She carried 700 ingots at a time in a three-hour crossing, but in 1882 the Bessie Brady was destroyed by fire. The Carson and Colorado Railroad constructed a narrow gauge railway to Keeler in 1883. The success of the Cerro Gordo mines caused Keeler to boom until silver prices plummeted in the late 19th century.

A second boom of zinc mining in the early 20th century brought new life to the town and an aerial cable tramway was built to bring the ore from Cerro Gordo to Keeler. There were small surges in the mining of silver, lead, zinc and limestone, but by the 1950s all mining had ceased. Train service was stopped in 1960 and the tracks were removed in 1961. Water exports from the Owens Valley to the City of Los Angeles in the 1920s led the Owens Lake to eventually dry up, causing alkali dust storms to blow through Keeler, driving many residents away. Dust remediation efforts in the early 21st century reduced this problem, but few residents remain.

A post office operated at Keeler from 1883 to 1898 and is still operating today.

There is a California Historical Landmark in Keeler for the furnace of the Owens Lake Silver Company.

Geography

Keeler is located along the eastern shores of Owens Lake (a dry lakebed) along State Route 136.

Demographics

2010
At the 2010 census Keeler had a population of 66. The racial makeup of Keeler was 63 (96%) White, 0 African American, 0 Native American, 2 (3%) Asian, 0 Pacific Islander, 0 from other races, and 1 (2%) from two or more races. Hispanic or Latino of any race were six people (9%).

The census reported that 100% of the population lived in households.

There were 40 households; four (10%) had children under the age of 18 living in them, 13 (33%) were opposite-sex married couples living together, two (5%) had a female householder with no husband present and two (5%) had a male householder with no wife present.  There were no unmarried opposite-sex partnerships, and no same-sex married couples or partnerships. Twenty three households (58%) were one person, and 12 (30%) had someone living alone who was 65 or older. The average household size was 1.7.  There were 17 families (43% of households); the average family size was 2.5.

The age distribution was nine people (14%) under the age of 18, one person (2%) aged 18 to 24, one person (2%) aged 25 to 44, 33 people (50%) aged 45 to 64, and 22 people (33%) who were 65 or older.  The median age was 59.3 years. Pro rata, for every 100 females, there were 120.0 males.  For every 100 females age 18 and over, there were 147.8 males.

The homeowner vacancy rate was 3%; the rental vacancy rate was 22%.  55 people (83% of the population) lived in owner-occupied housing units and 11 people (17%) lived in rental housing units.

2000
At the 2000 census there were 66 people, 36 households, and 19 families in the CDP. The racial makeup of the CDP was 97% White, 1% from other races, and 1% from two or more races. 12% of the population were Hispanic or Latino.
Of the 36 households 11% had children under the age of 18 living with them, 39% were married couples living together, 6% had a female householder with no husband present, and 47% were non-families. 39% of households were one person and 22% were one person aged 65 or older. The average household size was 1.8 and the average family size was 2.4.

The age distribution was 14% under the age of 18, 2% from 18 to 24, 11% from 25 to 44, 36% from 45 to 64, and 38% 65 or older. The median age was 57 years. For every 100 females, there were 112.9 males. For every 100 females age 18 and over, there were 111.1 males.

The median household income was $19,625 and the median family income  was $26,250. The per capita income for the CDP was $18,621. There were no families and 9% of the population living below the poverty line, including no under 18s and none of those over 64.

Government

In fiction
Keeler is mentioned in the final chapters of Frank Norris' novel, McTeague (1899).

Keeler appears in films such as Outlaws of the Desert (1941), Sinister Journey (1948) and The Blazing Sun (1950).

See also
 California Water Wars

References

External links

 Keeler Post Office: http://stampcollectingroundup.blogspot.com/2007/06/save-keeler-post-office.html

Census-designated places in California
Census-designated places in Inyo County, California
Mining communities in California
Populated places in the Mojave Desert